The 1968 Cupa României Final was the 30th final of Romania's most prestigious football cup competition. It was disputed between Dinamo București and Rapid București, and was won by Dinamo București after a game with 4 goals after extra time. Alexandru Neagu failed a penalty in 90 minutes for Rapid București. It was the 3rd cup for Dinamo București.

Match details

See also 
List of Cupa României finals

References

External links
Romaniansoccer.ro

1968
Cupa
Romania
1968 Cupa Romaniei
FC Rapid București matches